Kyle Westmoreland (born September 20, 1991) is an American professional golfer.

College career
Westmoreland competed for the United States Air Force Academy where he was named male athlete of the year in 2014 after finishing 4th at the Mountain West Conference championships.

Professional career
Westmoreland made the cut at the 2021 U.S. Open and finished in a tie for 68th place, becoming the first Air Force Academy graduate to do so.  He was medalist at local qualifying during the qualification process.

He has also had status on PGA Tour Canada.

In 2022, Westmoreland played on the Korn Ferry Tour with a best finish of T-7th place at AdventHealth Championship.

He earned his PGA Tour card for the 2022–23 season via the 2022 Korn Ferry Tour Finals.

Amateur wins
2011 Service Academy Classic
2013 Jackrabbit Invitational, Gene Miranda Falcon Invite, Patriot All-America

Source:

See also
2022 Korn Ferry Tour Finals graduates

References

External links

American male golfers
PGA Tour golfers
Air Force Falcons men's golfers
Korn Ferry Tour graduates
United States Air Force officers
People from Lewisville, Texas
People from Katy, Texas
1991 births
Living people